D. crocea may refer to:

 Dahlia crocea, a perennial plant
 Dipoena crocea, a tangle-web spider
 Diversidoris crocea, a sea slug
 Dyckia crocea, a plant native to Brazil